Lathroeus is a genus of beetles in the family Cerambycidae, containing the following species:

 Lathroeus mysticus Melzer, 1932
 Lathroeus oreoderoides Thomson, 1864

References

Acanthocinini